Jack Marriott may refer to:
 Jack Marriott (Royal Navy officer) (1879–1938), British naval officer
 Jack Marriott (footballer) (born 1994), English footballer

See also
 John Marriott (disambiguation)